Park Hyo-Ji (Hangul: 박효지, born October 23, 1988 in Incheon) is a South Korean female taekwondo practitioner.

Career

In 2007, she was selected as a member of the South Korean national taekwondo team and competed in the 2007 World Taekwondo Championships, but lost to Charlotte Craig of the United States in Round of 32.

In July 2009, Park won the gold medal in finweight (-47 kg) at the Summer Universiade in Belgrade, Serbia.  On October 17, she won the gold medal in finweight (-46 kg) at the 2009 World Taekwondo Championships in Copenhagen, Denmark.

References

External links

Living people
South Korean female taekwondo practitioners
1988 births
Sportspeople from Incheon
Universiade medalists in taekwondo
Universiade gold medalists for South Korea
World Taekwondo Championships medalists
Medalists at the 2009 Summer Universiade
21st-century South Korean women